Bence Pulai (born 27 October 1991) is a Hungarian swimmer. He was part of the Hungarian men's teams that won bronze in the men's 4 x 100 m medley relay at the 2012 and 2014 European Championships.

At the 2012 Summer Olympics, he competed in the Men's 100 metre butterfly, finishing in 12th place overall in the heats, failing to qualify for the semifinals.  He also took part in the men's 4 x 100 m medley relay, with the Hungarian team finishing in 9th place.

At the 2016 Olympics, he participated in the same two events, again not reaching the final in the men's 100 m butterfly, but reaching the final with the Hungarian team that finished in 5th in the men's 4 x 100 m medley relay.

His father is Imre Pulai, Olympic champion sprint canoer.

References

Hungarian male swimmers
1991 births
Living people
Olympic swimmers of Hungary
Swimmers at the 2012 Summer Olympics
Swimmers at the 2016 Summer Olympics
Male butterfly swimmers
Swimmers from Budapest
20th-century Hungarian people
21st-century Hungarian people